Szczecin Voivodeship may also refer to:

Szczecin Voivodeship (1946–1975)
Szczecin Voivodeship (1975–1998)
West Pomeranian Voivodeship, with the capital in Szczecin